Matthew Brendan McAndrew (born September 6, 1990) is an American singer-songwriter best known for his appearance in Season 7 of NBC's reality TV singing competition The Voice, where he finished as the runner-up as part of team Adam. In January 2019, he became the lead vocalist of the American post-hardcore band Rain City Drive.

Early life
McAndrew was born to Brenda (née Gordon) and Patrick McAndrew. He grew up in the small town of Barnegat Light, New Jersey, and has been writing songs and performing in bands since he was a boy. During his senior year at the Southern Regional High School in Manahawkin, New Jersey, he decided to pursue a music career. He attended the University of the Arts, Philadelphia, graduating in 2013.

Career

Early days
In 2010, McAndrew started writing solo acoustic material and playing his songs at open mic nights, ice cream parlors, and bars. He worked at Bach To Rock, a national music school franchise with a location in suburban Philadelphia, teaching voice, guitar and ukulele. He self-released an album called View of The Pines on March 1, 2014.

Among other projects including Other People, and Hollow Shoulder, McAndrew gained notoriety in High School for recording and performing a Christmas themed tribute album dedicated to classmate Dwight Wagaman.

2014: The Voice
On September 4, 2014, it was announced that McAndrew would compete in season 7 of The Voice. During his blind audition, he covered Christina Perri's "A Thousand Years". Three coaches (Adam Levine, Blake Shelton and Pharrell Williams) turned around. He chose Levine as his coach.

In the Battle rounds, McAndrew faced Ethan Butler where they sang "Yellow". McAndrew was chosen over Butler, and advanced to the Knockout rounds. McAndrew covered "Drops of Jupiter", defeated Rebekah Samarin, and advanced to the Live Playoffs. He covered The Beach Boys' "God Only Knows" and advanced through the Live shows, saved by "America's Vote". The following week, he sang Hozier's "Take Me to Church" and was saved by public voting. That night, he received the first "iTunes bonus multiplier" of the season, with his studio recording of "Take Me to Church" reaching the fifth position on the iTunes Top 200 Singles chart at the close of the voting window. The song also charted at number 92 on the Billboard Hot 100.

In top 10 he performed "Fix You" by Coldplay and was saved by America's voting. In Top 8 he covered Damien Rice's "The Blower's Daughter", which peaked at 40 on the Billboard Hot 100 and had opening sales of 92,000 downloads.

In the top 5 Live shows, McAndrew covered "Make it Rain" by Foy Vance and "I Still Haven't Found What I'm Looking For" by U2, and was voted through to the finale. During the finale the top four were given three songs to perform. McAndrew covered "Somewhere Over the Rainbow" and "Lost Stars", a duet with his coach Adam Levine. His third performance was the original song "Wasted Love", which was his first single to break the top 10 singles of the iTunes top 200 charts. A music video for "Wasted Love" was released on The Voices YouTube channel.

On December 16, 2014, McAndrew was announced as the runner-up of season 7 of The Voice, behind Craig Wayne Boyd.

On December 25, 2014, after the result of the show was announced, Billboard showed McAndrew's "Wasted Love" at 14th on the Hot 100 with opening sales of 209,000 units sold. This is the highest mark ever achieved by a The Voice recording artist to date.

 Studio version of performance reached the top 10 on iTunes

2015: Republic Records
On February 13, 2015, Republic Records officially announced that McAndrew was part of their Class of 2015 lineup of artists. On the same day, The Voice released a YouTube video of Adam Levine drawing a checkmark on McAndew's wrist, which was then made permanent by Studio City Tattoo, signifying that he had a record contract.

2016: New label
On April 28, 2016, McAndrew announced that he had started a PledgeMusic campaign shortly after parting ways with Republic Records. He stated in his Pledge pitch, "Under my contract with the label, I wasn't able to release new music,  got out of that deal, and now I'm able to share some awesome new songs with you guys." On September 9, 2016, McAndrew released the independent EP Rush In Slowly, produced by Job Killer Records.

2019-present: Rain City Drive
In January 2019, he became the lead vocalist in the American post-hardcore band Rain City Drive.

Discography

Studio albums

Singles

Releases from The Voice

Albums

Singles

Slaves

Singles

References

1990 births
American male pop singers
Living people
The Voice (franchise) contestants
21st-century American singers
People from Barnegat Light, New Jersey
Singers from New Jersey
Southern Regional High School alumni
21st-century American male singers